Myrmecomelix is a genus of South American dwarf spiders that was first described by Norman I. Platnick in 1993.

Species
 it contains two species:
Myrmecomelix leucippus Miller, 2007 – Peru
Myrmecomelix pulcher (Millidge, 1991) (type) – Ecuador, Peru

See also
 List of Linyphiidae species (I–P)

References

Araneomorphae genera
Linyphiidae
Spiders of South America